The Military ranks of Argentina are the military insignia used by the Armed Forces of the Argentine Republic.

Commissioned officer ranks
The rank insignia of commissioned officers.

Other ranks
The rank insignia of non-commissioned officers and enlisted personnel.

References

External links